Aliona Doletskaya (born 10 January 1955) is a Russian journalist and translator, the former editor in chief of Vogue Russia (1998–2010), and the editor in chief of the Russian Interview (magazine).

Career
After graduating from the Faculty of Philology of Moscow State University, she defended her dissertation on contemporary rhetoric and published several translations of books by authors such as Ray Bradbury and William Faulkner. She did her doctoral work at Oxford University, but did not graduate.

In the early 90s Doletskaya changed her field of activity from the educational sphere to the sphere of media and PR. After working as a reporter and producer of various European television channels, as well as media consultant for jewelry company DeBeers, Aliona Doletskaya was appointed Director of Public Relations at the British Council in Russia. In this role, she has successfully managed several cultural projects, including mounting an exhibition of The Royal Academy's "Living Bridges" in the Tretyakov Gallery and a joint exhibition in the Kremlin and the Tower of London "Treasures of the Tower".

In 1998, she was asked to lead the magazine Vogue Russia, at the time the first edition of this level in the country. Under the guidance of Aliona Doletskaya magazine Vogue Russia continues to be the most authoritative edition of fashion in Russia, whose content is characterized by a high degree of creativity and absolute quality.

Aliona left Vogue in 2010 to work on the launch of Andy Warhol’s Interview Magazine in 2011 both in Russia and in Germany.  Aliona is currently the Russian editor-in-chief.

In 2012 she also began to host her morning programs on Dozhd. Shortly afterwards in 2013, she published her books "Morning. 50 Breakfasts", and "Sunday Dinners".

In 2013, Aliona also hosted on Dozhd «Evening With Doletskaya» - a talk show aimed at challenging her male high-profile guests.

External links 

 
 Interview for New York Times
 Сталинград (Stalingrad) in Vogue  
 Never say never

1955 births
Living people
Journalists from Moscow
Russian women journalists
TV Rain
Moscow State University alumni